Grand Prairie Municipal Airport  is five miles southwest of Grand Prairie, a city largely in Dallas County, Texas.

Most U.S. airports use the same three-letter location identifier for the FAA and IATA, but Grand Prairie Municipal Airport is GPM to the FAA and has no IATA code.

Facilities
In the year ending May 31, 2007 the airport had 98,001 aircraft operations, average 268 per day: 99.8% general aviation and 0.2% military. 287 aircraft are based at the airport: 82% single-engine, 6% multi-engine and 12% helicopter. Airbus Helicopters Inc has its headquarters on the west side of the airport.

References

External links 
 

Airports in Texas
Transportation in Tarrant County, Texas
Buildings and structures in Tarrant County, Texas